Curzio Malaparte (9 June 1898 – 19 July 1957), born Kurt Erich Suckert, was an Italian writer, filmmaker, war correspondent and diplomat. Malaparte is best known outside Italy due to his works Kaputt (1944) and La pelle (1949). The former is a semi-fictionalised account of the Eastern Front during the Second World War and the latter is an account focusing on morality in the immediate post-war period of Naples (it was placed on the Index Librorum Prohibitorum).

During the 1920s, Malaparte was one of the intellectuals who supported the rise of Italian fascism and Benito Mussolini, through the magazine 900. Despite this, Malaparte had a complex relationship with the National Fascist Party and was stripped of membership in 1933 for his independent streak. Arrested numerous times, he had Casa Malaparte created in Capri where he lived under house arrest. After the Second World War, he became a filmmaker and moved closer to both Togliatti's Italian Communist Party and the Catholic Church (though once a staunch atheist), reputedly becoming a member of both before his death.

Biography

Background
Born in Prato, Tuscany, Malaparte was a son of a German father, Erwin Suckert, a textile-manufacturing executive, and his Lombard wife, née Evelina Perelli. He was educated at Collegio Cicognini in Prato and at La Sapienza University of Rome. In 1918 he started his career as a journalist. Malaparte fought in World War I, earning a captaincy in the Fifth Alpine Regiment and several decorations for valor.

His chosen surname Malaparte, which he used from 1925, means "evil/wrong side" and is a play on Napoleon's family name "Bonaparte" which means, in Italian, "good side".

National Fascist Party
In 1922, he took part in Benito Mussolini's March on Rome. In 1924, he founded the Roman periodical La Conquista dello Stato ("The Conquest of the State", a title that would inspire Ramiro Ledesma Ramos' La Conquista del Estado). As a member of the Partito Nazionale Fascista, he founded several periodicals and contributed essays and articles to others, as well as writing numerous books, starting from the early 1920s, and directing two metropolitan newspapers.

In 1926, he founded with Massimo Bontempelli the literary quarterly "900". He later became a co-editor of Fiera Letteraria (1928–31), and an editor of La Stampa in Turin. His polemical war novel-essay, Viva Caporetto! (1921), criticized corrupt Rome and the Italian upper classes as the real enemy (the book was forbidden because it offended the Royal Italian Army).

Technique du coup d'Etat
In Technique du coup d`Etat (1931), Malaparte set out a study of the tactics of coup d'etat, particularly focusing on the Bolshevik Revolution and that of Italian fascism. Here he stated that "the problem of the conquest and defense of the State is not a political one ... it is a technical problem", a way of knowing when and how to occupy the vital state resources: the telephone exchanges, the water reserves and the electricity generators, etc. He taught a hard lesson that a revolution can wear itself out in strategy. He emphasizes Leon Trotsky's role in organising the October Revolution technically, while Lenin was more interested in strategy. The book emphasizes that Joseph Stalin thoroughly comprehended the technical aspects employed by Trotsky and so was able to avert Left Opposition coup attempts better than Kerensky.

For Malaparte, Mussolini's revolutionary outlook was very much born of his time as a Marxist. On the topic of Adolf Hitler, the book was far more doubtful and critical. He considered Hitler to be a reactionary. In the same book, first published in French by Grasset, he entitled chapter VIII: A Woman: Hitler. This led to Malaparte being stripped of his National Fascist Party membership and sent to internal exile from 1933 to 1938 on the island of Lipari.

Arrests and Casa Malaparte
He was freed on the personal intervention of Mussolini's son-in-law and heir apparent Galeazzo Ciano. Mussolini's regime arrested Malaparte again in 1938, 1939, 1941, and 1943, imprisoning him in Rome's jail Regina Coeli. During that time (1938–41) he built a house with the architect Adalberto Libera, known as the Casa Malaparte, on Capo Massullo, on the Isle of Capri. It was later used as a location in Jean-Luc Godard's film Le Mépris.

Shortly after his time in jail he published books of magical realist autobiographical short stories, which culminated in the stylistic prose of Donna come me (Woman Like Me, 1940).

Second World War and Kaputt
His remarkable knowledge of Europe and its leaders is based upon his experience as a correspondent and in the Italian diplomatic service. In 1941 he was sent to cover the Eastern Front as a correspondent for Corriere della Sera. The articles he sent back from the Ukrainian Fronts, many of which were suppressed, were collected in 1943 and brought out under the title Il Volga nasce in Europa ("The Volga Rises in Europe"). The experience provided the basis for his two most famous books, Kaputt (1944) and The Skin (1949).

Kaputt, his novelistic account of the war, surreptitiously written, presents the conflict from the point of view of those doomed to lose it. Malaparte's account is marked by lyrical observations, as when he encounters a detachment of Wehrmacht soldiers fleeing a Ukrainian battlefield,

In the foreword to Kaputt, Malaparte describes in detail the convoluted process of writing. He had started writing it in the autumn of 1941, while staying in the home of Roman Souchena in the Ukrainian village of Pestchianka, located near the local "House of the Soviets" which was requisitioned by the SS; the village was then just two miles behind the front. Souchena was an educated peasant, whose small home library included the complete works of Pushkin and Gogol. Souchena's young wife, absorbed in Eugene Onegin after a hard day's work, reminded Malaparte of Elena and Alda, the two daughters of Benedetto Croce. The Souchena couple helped Malaparte's writing project, he keeping the manuscript well hidden in his house against German searches and she sewing it into the lining of Malaparte's clothing when he was expelled from the Ukrainian front because of the scandal of his articles in Corriere della Sera. He continued the writing in January and February 1942, which he spent in Nazi-occupied Poland and at the Smolensk Front. From there he went to Finland, where he spent two years - during which he completed all but the final chapter of the book. Having contracted a serious illness at the Petsamo Front in Lapland, he was granted a convalescence leave in Italy. En route, the Gestapo boarded his plane at the Tempelhof Airport in Berlin and the belongings of all passengers were thoroughly searched. Fortunately, no page of Kaputt  was in his luggage. Before leaving Helsinki, he had taken the precaution of entrusting the manuscript to several Helsinki-based diplomats: Count , Minister at the Spanish Legation; Prince Dina Cantemir, Secretary of the Romanian Legation; and Titu Michai, the Romanian press attaché. With the help of these diplomats, the manuscript finally reached Malaparte in Italy, where he was able to publish it.

One of the most well-known and often quoted episodes of Kaputt concerns the interview which Malaparte - as an Italian reporter, supposedly on the Axis side - had with Ante Pavelić, who headed the Croat puppet state set up by the Nazis.

Milan Kundera's view of the Kaputt is summarized in his essay The Tragedy of Central Europe:

According to D. Moore's editorial note, in The Skin,

The book was condemned by the Roman Catholic Church, and placed on the Index Librorum Prohibitorum. The Skin was adapted for the cinema in 1981.

From November 1943 to March 1946 he was attached to the American High Command in Italy as an Italian Liaison Officer. Articles by Curzio Malaparte have appeared in many literary periodicals of note in France, the United Kingdom, Italy and the United States
.

Film directing and later life

After the war, Malaparte's political sympathies veered to the left and he became a member of the Italian Communist Party. In 1947, Malaparte settled in Paris and wrote dramas without much success. His play Du Côté de chez Proust was based on the life of Marcel Proust and Das Kapital was a portrait of Karl Marx. Cristo Proibito ("Forbidden Christ") was Malaparte's moderately successful film—which he wrote, directed and scored in 1950. It won the "City of Berlin" special prize at the 1st Berlin International Film Festival in 1951. In the story, a war veteran returns to his village to avenge the death of his brother, shot by the Germans. It was released in the United States in 1953 as Strange Deception and voted among the five best foreign films by the National Board of Review. He also produced the variety show Sexophone and planned to cross the United States on bicycle. Just before his death, Malaparte completed the treatment of another film, Il Compagno P.

After the establishment of the People's Republic of China in 1949, Malaparte became interested in the Maoist version of Communism. Malaparte visited China in 1956 to commemorate the death of the Chinese essay and fiction writer, Lu Xun. He was moved and excited by what he saw, but his journey was cut short by illness, and he was flown back to Rome. Io in Russia e in Cina, his journal of the events, was published posthumously in 1958. He willed his house in Capri to the Chinese Writers Association as a study and residence center for Chinese writers. But at the time of his death in 1957 there were no diplomatic relations with the Peoples Republic, so the transfer could not take place, and the family succeeded in changing the will.

Malaparte's final book, Maledetti Toscani, his attack on middle and upper-class culture, appeared in 1956. In the collection of writings Mamma marcia, published posthumously in 1959, Malaparte writes about the youth of the post-World War II era with homophobic tones, describing it as effeminate and tending to homosexuality and communism; the same content is expressed in the chapters "The pink meat" and "Children of Adam" of The Skin. He died in Rome from lung cancer on 19 July 1957.

Cultural representations of Malaparte 
Malaparte's colorful life has made him an object of fascination for writers. The American journalist, Percy Winner, wrote about their relationship during the fascist ventennio (twenty year period) and the Allied Occupation of Italy, in the lightly fictionalized novel, Dario (1947) (where the main character's last name is Duvolti, or a play on "two faces"). Recently, the Italian authors Rita Monaldi and Francesco Sorti published Morte Come Me (Death Like Me, 2016). Set on Capri in 1939, it gives a fictionalized account of a mysterious death in which Malaparte was implicated.

Main writings
 Viva Caporetto! (1921, A.K.A. La rivolta dei santi maledetti)
 Technique du coup d'etat  (1931) translated as Coup D'etat: The Technique of revolution, E. P. Dutton & Co., Inc., 1932
 Donna come me (1940) translated as Woman Like Me, Troubador Italian Studies, 2006 
  (1943) 
 Kaputt (1944)  translated as  New York Review Books Classics, 2007
 Du Côté de chez Proust (1951)
 Maledetti toscani (1956) translated as Those Cursed Tuscans, Ohio University Press, 1964
 The Kremlin Ball (1957) translated by Jenny McPhee, 2018 
 Muss. Il grande imbecille (1999) 
 Benedetti italiani postumo (curato da Enrico Falqui) (1961), edito da Vallecchi Firenze (2005), presentazione di Giordano Bruno Guerri 
 The Bird that Swallowed its Cage: The Selected Writings of Curzio Malaparte adapted and translated by Walter Murch, 2013 
Diary of a Foreigner in Paris, translated by Stephen Twilley (New York Review Books Classics, 2020)

Filmography
The Forbidden Christ (1950)

See also

Louis-Ferdinand Céline
 Galeazzo Ciano and Edda Ciano
 Camilo José Cela

References

Sources
 Malaparte: A House Like Me by Michael McDonough, 1999, 
 The Appeal of Fascism: A Study of Intellectuals and Fascism 1919–1945 by Alastair Hamilton (London, 1971)
 Kaputt by Curzio Malaparte, E. P. Dutton and Comp., Inc., New York, 1946 (biographical note on the book cover)
 Curzio Malaparte The Skin, Northwestern University Press, Evanston, 1997 (D. Moore's editorial note on the back cover)
 Curzio Malaparte: The Narrative Contract Strained by William Hope, Troubador Publishing Ltd, 2000, 
 The Bird that swallowed its Cage selected works by Malaparte translated by Walter Murch, Counterpoint Press, Berkeley, 2012, .
 European memories of the Second World War by Helmut Peitsch (editor) Berghahn Books, 1999  Chapter Changing Identities Through Memory: Malaparte's Self-figuratios in Kaputt by Charles Burdett, p. 110–119
 Malaparte Zwischen Erdbeben by Jobst Welge, Eichborn Verlag, Frankfurt-am-Main 2007 
 Benedetti italiani: Raccolta postuma, di scritti di Curzio Malaparte, curata da Enrico Falqui (1961). Ristampato da Vallecchi Editore Firenze, (2005) prefazione di Giordano Bruno Guerri, 
 Il Malaparte Illustrato di Giordano Bruno Guerri (Mondadori, 1998)

External links
 
 
 Francobolli Pratesi
 The Traitor by Curzio Malaparte
 Why everyone hates Malaparte
 New York Books Review Curzio Malaparte
 MALAPARTE portrait of an Italian surrealist
 

 
1898 births
1957 deaths
People from Prato
Capri, Campania
Italian war correspondents
Italian communists
Italian Roman Catholics
Italian diplomats
Italian dramatists and playwrights
Italian essayists
Male essayists
Italian expatriates in France
Italian fascists
Italian film directors
Italian military personnel of World War I
Italian people of German descent
Italian prisoners and detainees
Italian male short story writers
Italian people of Lombard descent
Italian male novelists
Italian male dramatists and playwrights
20th-century Italian novelists
20th-century male writers
20th-century Italian dramatists and playwrights
20th-century Italian short story writers
20th-century essayists
Italian magazine editors
Italian newspaper editors
Italian male journalists
Italian male non-fiction writers
La Stampa editors
Writers from Campania